Becton is an unincorporated community in northeast Lubbock County, about  northeast of Lubbock, Texas.  This small rural community lies on the high plains of the Llano Estacado in West Texas.

Becton began as a ranching community and was originally named Bledsoe for W. E. Bledsoe of the Three Circle Ranch.  Later, while applying for a post office in 1917, it was discovered that another Texas town was already named Bledsoe, so the name was changed to Becton, after Abner M. Becton, an early settler who donated land for a new school building.

Today, Becton is primarily a farming community and is surrounded by numerous sections of plowed land.  The primary crop is cotton, but lesser amounts of grain sorghum and winter wheat are also grown in the area.  Crops are grown on both irrigated and dry-land farms.  Water for irrigation is pumped from the underlying Ogallala Aquifer, and is applied using center-pivot irrigation systems. The aquifer is quickly becoming depleted, so sometime in the future, all farms may have to revert to dry-land cropping systems.

The Fort Worth and Denver South Plains Railway, which extended from Estelline to Lubbock, used to pass through town, but the BNSF Railway, which last owned and operated the railway, abandoned and removed the tracks in 1989.

In the early days, mail reached Becton by way of Lorenzo Star Route until the Fort Worth and Denver South Plains Railway began operation in 1928.  The post office was shut down in the 1940s.

The first school was a wooden, one-room building constructed by W. E. Bledsoe. The school also served as a church. It was moved to a new location in 1910, but later burned and was replaced by a new brick building in 1924. The Bledsoe Independent School District was one of the oldest in Lubbock County, and at one time it was incorporated with the Estacado school district. In the summer of 1936, Bledsoe School consolidated and was absorbed by the Idalou school district.

In 1936, Becton had three businesses, two schools, a church, and a population of 25. In 1946, three businesses were still operating, and the population had increased slightly to 150. In 1974, Becton had no businesses and the population decreased to 125. In 1978, the community had three churches and a factory, and in 1990 and 200, it had no businesses and 125 residents.

See also
Barwise, Texas
Estacado, Texas
Heckville, Texas
Mount Blanco
White River (Texas)

References

External links

Public domain photos of the Llano Estacado

Unincorporated communities in Lubbock County, Texas
Unincorporated communities in Texas
1910 establishments in Texas